The Cephalothecaceae are a family of fungi in the class Sordariomycetes. The family was circumscribed in 1917 by Austrian naturalist Franz Xaver Rudolf von Höhnel. Species in this family are saprobic, often growing on rotten wood or on other fungi. They are known to be distributed in northern temperate regions.

References

Sordariales
Ascomycota families
Taxa named by Franz Xaver Rudolf von Höhnel
Taxa described in 1917